Talukdar Mohammad Anwar Jung was a Bangladesh Awami League politician and the former Member of Parliament of Dhaka-18.

Career
Talukdar was elected to parliament from Dhaka-18 as a Bangladesh Awami League candidate in 1973. He died in 1986.

Personal life
Talukdar's son, Talukdar Mohammad Towhid Jung Murad, became a member of parliament from his constituency in 2008.

References

Former parliament members from Dhaka-18
Awami League politicians
1986 deaths
1st Jatiya Sangsad members